The Roman Pontifical, in Latin Pontificale Romanum, is the pontifical as used by the Roman Rite of the Catholic Church. It is the liturgical book that contains the rites and ceremonies usually performed by bishops of the Roman Rite.

The pontifical is the compendium of rites for the enactment of certain sacraments and sacramentals that may be celebrated by a bishop, including especially the consecration of holy chrism, and the sacraments of confirmation and holy orders. However, it does not include the rites for the Mass or the Divine Office, which can be found in the Roman Missal and Liturgy of the Hours respectively. Because of the use of the  adjective pontifical in other contexts to refer to the Pope, it is sometimes mistakenly thought that the Pontificale Romanum is a book reserved to the Pope. It could be argued that it is the book of those entitled to the use, in certain contexts, of the pontificalia, i.e. episcopal insignia. These are not always limited just to bishops, but–according to current 1983 Code of Canon Law of the Latin Church–it can in certain circumstances be used by others including abbots and rulers of dioceses or quasi-dioceses who have not been ordained bishops.

Sources 
The Pontifical has its sources mostly in texts and rubrics which existed in the old sacramentaries and Ordines Romani and were gradually collected together to form one volume for the greater convenience of the officiating bishop. The earliest pontificals date from the late ninth century. From the mid-tenth century, one particular compilation, known to historians as the Pontificale Romano-Germanicum, became dominant, and was widely copied.

Edition history 
Under Clement VIII, a standard version was published for the use of the entire Roman Rite, under the title Pontificale Romanum. It was reprinted by authority with many variations many times, and its last typical edition following this form is from 1962. In 1968, it was recast and restructured according to the decisions of the Second Vatican Council. In December 2021, six months after the promulgation of the motu propio, Traditionis custodes, which put restrictions on the use of the Missal of 1962, Arthur Roche, Prefect of the Congregation for Divine Worship and the Discipline of the Sacraments, stated that Bishops did not have permission to authorize the use of the Pontificale Romanum that was issued in 1962 and that this edition was no longer in use. On February 11, 2022, however, Pope Francis clarified in a Latin statement that the Priestly Fraternity of St. Peter, and bishops who work with their priests and apostolates, may continue to utilize the former liturgical books ("namely the Missal, the Ritual, the Pontifical and the Roman Breviary, in force in the year 1962"), and other former Ecclesia Dei communities have taken this to mean that the same applies to them.

See also
Breviary
Cæremoniale Episcoporum
Euchologion
Missal
Pontifical vestments
Rituale Romanum
Solemn Pontifical Mass

References

References

Roman Rite liturgical books
Types of illuminated manuscript